Gastouri is a Greek village located about 10 kilometres south of the city of Corfu. Gastouri was established as a settlement on 28 January 1866 by publication of the decision in the Greek government gazette. In 1995, administratively, it belonged to the municipality of Achilleion. In 2019, it was removed from the administrative unit of the municipality of Corfu, and was transferred to the municipality of Central Corfu and Diapontia Islands. Gastouri is the location of Achilleion palace, built by Empress Elisabeth of Austria.

Population

References 

Populated places in Corfu (regional unit)